London bus bombing may refer to:
Aldwych bus bombing, 1996
Tavistock Square bus bombing, part of the 2005 London bombings